Shooting at the 2014 Asian Games was held in Pistol/Rifle at Ongnyeon International Shooting Range & Shotgun and Gyeonggido Shooting Range in Incheon, South Korea between 20 and 30 September 2014.

Schedule

Medalists

Men

Women

Medal table

Participating nations
A total of 543 athletes from 34 nations competed in shooting at the 2014 Asian Games:

References 

 ISSF Results Overview

External links
Official website

 
2014 Asian Games events
2014 Asian Games
2014
Asian Games